Brassia keiliana is a species of orchid. It is native to Colombia, Venezuela and Guyana.

References

External links
 
 

keiliana
Plants described in 1852
Orchids of Colombia
Orchids of Venezuela
Orchids of Guyana